Froning is a surname. Notable people with the surname include:

Mary Froning (1934–2014), American baseball player
Oliver Froning (born 1963), German musician
Rich Froning Jr. (born 1987), American CrossFit athlete